The following is a list of notable deaths in May 1997.

Entries for each day are listed alphabetically by surname. A typical entry lists information in the following sequence:
 Name, age, country of citizenship at birth, subsequent country of citizenship (if applicable), reason for notability, cause of death (if known), and reference.

May 1997

1
Elena Altieri, 80, Italian actress.
Tridib Chaudhuri, 85, Indian politician and Indian independence activist.
Russell G. Cleary, 63, American brewer, complications from heart surgery.
Fernand Dumont, 69, Canadian sociologist, philosopher, and theologian.
Friedl Däuber, 86, German alpine and cross-country skier.
Jim McDonald, 81, American football player and coach.
Arthur Milne, 82, Scottish football player.
Bo Widerberg, 66, Swedish actor and film director, stomach cancer.

2
Raymond Sarif Easmon, 84, Sierra Leonean doctor and writer.
John Eccles, 94, Australian neurophysiologist, recipient of the Nobel Prize in Physiology or Medicine.
Heinz Ellenberg, 83, German biologist, botanist and ecologist.
Paulo Freire, 75, Brazilian educator and philosopher, heart attack.
Walter Hill, 62, American serial killer, execution by electrocution.
Robin Kinahan, 80, Northern Irish politician and Orange Order member.
Werner Lott, 89, German U-boat commander during World War II.
Ralph McCreath, 78, Canadian figure skater.
Queen Mother Moore, 98, African-American civil rights leader and a black nationalist.
Keith R. Porter, 84, Canadian-American cell biologist, pneumonia.
Eugene Vale, 81, American novelist.
Jimmy Wilson, 77, American Negro league baseball player.

3
Bruce Beetham, 61, New Zealand academic and politician, heart failure.
Gerrit den Braber, 68, Dutch songwriter and lyricist, stroke.
Sébastien Enjolras, 21, French racing driver, racing accident.
Hughie Green, 77, English presenter, game show host and actor, cancer.
Sir John Junor, 78, British journalist and editor of the Daily Express.
Louis, Prince Napoléon, 83, French member of the Bonaparte dynasty.
Narciso Yepes, 69, Spanish guitarist, cancer.

4
Suhayr al-Qalamawi, 85, Egyptian literary figure and politician.
Jerome Alden, 76, American playwright and screenwriter, kidney cancer.
Wijeyananda Dahanayake, 95, Sri Lankan politician.
Esin Engin, 51, Turkish musician, composer, and film actor, leukemia.
Danilo Fioravanti, 83, Italian gymnast and Olympian.
Hilary Grivich, 19, American gymnast and diver, car accident.
Fernando Hernández, 52, Costa Rican footballer, cancer.
Lee Miglin, 72, American businessman and philanthropist, murdered by serial killer Andrew Cunanan.
Alvy Moore, 75, American actor (Green Acres, The Littles, Nausicaä of the Valley of the Wind), heart failure.
Lyman Bradford Smith, 92, American botanist.
Lou Stathis, 44, American author, critic and editor, brain tumor.

5
Bob Briggs, 52, American gridiron football player.
George Burns, 86, British Army officer.
Walter Gotell, 73, German actor (From Russia with Love, The Spy Who Loved Me, The Living Daylights), cancer.
Alan Gussow, 65, American artist, author and conservationist, cancer.
Murray Kempton, 79, American journalist and Pullitzer Prize winner, pancreatic cancer.
David Scherman, 81, American photojournalist and editor, cancer.

6
Ridge Bond, 74, American actor and singer.
Sydney Joseph Freedberg, 82, American art historian and curator.
Jorge Martínez de Hoyos, 76, Mexican actor, lung cancer.
John Edwards Hill, 68, British mammalogist.
Günther Jerschke, 75, German actor.
Wang You, 86, Chinese biochemist.

7
John C. Ewers, 87, American ethnologist and museum curator.
Yip Hon, 93, Chinese gambling tycoon, heart attack.
George Lynch, 78, American race car driver.
Tom Lysons, 62, Canadian politician.

8
Joachim Angermeyer, 73, German businessman and politician.
Bijoy Chandra Bhagavati, 92, Indian politician.
Ralph Wendell Burhoe, 85, American theologian.
Scott Carpenter, 22, American convicted murderer, execution by lethal injection.
Pat Hughes, 94, English tennis player.
Bernhard Nooni, 88, Estonian football player.
Clara Ottesen, 85, Norwegian government official, aid worker and politician.
Nunzio Provenzano, 74, American mobster.
William R. Royal, 92, American Air Force scuba diver.
Michael Shersby, 64, British politician.
Kai-Uwe von Hassel, 84, German politician, heart attack.
Micheline Kerney Walsh, 77, Irish archivist and historian.
Bob Whitcher, 80, American baseball player.

9
Rawya Ateya, 71, Egyptian woman and first female parliamentarian in the Arab world.
Bob Devaney, 82, American gridiron football coach, heart attack.
Marco Ferreri, 68, Italian film director, screenwriter and actor, heart attack.
Willy Hess, 90, Swiss musicologist and composer.
Kazumi Kawai, 32, Japanese actress, suicide.
Rina Lasnier, 86, Québécois poet.
Augusto Céspedes Patzi, 93, Bolivian writer, politician, diplomat, and journalist.
Paul Zastupnevich, 75, American costume designer.

10
Bernard Anderson, 77, American jazz trumpeter.
Jacinto Quincoces, 91, Spanish football player and manager.
Silvano Tranquilli, 71, Italian actor.
Joan Weston, 62, American Roller derby skater, Creutzfeldt-Jakob disease.

11
William Ragsdale Cannon, 81, American theologian and bishop of the United Methodist Church.
David Christie, 49, French singer-songwriter, suicide.
Ernie Fields, 92, American trombonist, pianist, arranger and bandleader.
Genine Graham, 70, English actress.
Dean M. Kelley, 70, American legal scholar, cancer.
Catherine McLeod, 75, American actress.
Howard Morton, 71, American actor, stroke.
Peter Stackpole, 83, American photographer.

12
Louis Barbarin, 94, American jazz drummer.
Charles-Arthur Gauthier, 84, Canadian politician.
Jiří Pecka, 79, Czechoslovak slalom and sprint canoeist.
Henk Plenter, 83, Dutch football player.
Avraham Yitzchak Stern, 61, Israeli administrator and politician.
Frank A. Wenstrom, 93, American politician.

13
Laurie Lee, 82, English poet, novelist and screenwriter, colorectal cancer.
Carlos Augusto León, 82, Venezuelan poet, historian, politician and scientist.
Tommy Turrentine, 69, American swing and hard bop trumpeter and composer.
Zdeňka Veřmiřovská, 83, Czechoslovak/Czech gymnast and Olympian.
Eduard Zakharov, 22, Russian boxer, homicide.

14
Jambyn Batmönkh, 71, Mongolian communist politician.
Mel Bay, 84, American musician and music publisher.
Harry Blackstone, Jr., 62, American magician and television performer, pancreatic cancer.
Thelma Carpenter, 75, American jazz singer and actress, cardiac arrest.
Samuel Hoyt Elbert, 89, American linguist.
Alan Furlan, 77, Italian-American actor.
Morton Heilig, 70, American virtual reality technology pioneer and filmmaker.
Boris Parsadanian, 72, Armenian-Estonian composer.
Val Peat, 50, British sprinter and Olympian.
Bessie Schonberg, 90, German-American dancer and choreographer.

15
Oscar Berger, 96, American editorial cartoonist.
David Martin, 89, American politician, pneumonia.
Trevor Porteous, 63, English football player and coach.
Saadallah Wannous, Syrian playwright, cancer.

16
Donatien Mahele Lieko Bokungu, 56, Zairean general, execution by firing squad.
Flor Crowley, 62, Irish Fianna Fáil politician.
Giuseppe De Santis, 80, Italian film director (Bitter Rice), heart attack.
Elbridge Durbrow, 93, American diplomat and ambassador, stroke.
Bones McKinney, 78, American basketball player and coach.
Harry Charles Moore, 56, American convicted murderer, execution by lethal injection.
Wang Zengqi, 77, Chinese writer.

17
Tusten Ackerman, 95, American basketball player.
Mikhail Bychkov, 70, Russian ice hockey player.
Chris Julian, 60, English motorcycle racer, gyrocopter accident.
Durgabai Kamat, 97/98, first Indian female actress of Indian cinema.
Roscoe L. Koontz, 74, American health physicist.

18
Bridgette Andersen, 21, American actress.
Mikhail Anikushin, 79, Soviet and Russian sculptor.
Horst Lippmann, 70, German concert promoter and jazz musician.
Paolo Panelli, 71, Italian comedian and film actor, pulmonary edema.
Antonio Cornejo Polar, 60, Peruvian academic and literature and cultural critic.
Soenario, 94, Indonesian politician and Foreign Minister.

19
Aaron Henry, 74, American civil rights leader and politician, congestive heart failure.
Sombhu Mitra, 81, Indian actor, director and playwright.
Troy Ruttman, 67, American race car driver, lung cancer.
Pāvels Seņičevs, 72, Soviet sports shooter.

20
Don Parker, 88, British racing driver.
John Rawlins, 94, American film editor and director.
Virgilio Barco Vargas, 75, Colombian politician, cancer.
Gopal Yonjan, 53, Nepalese musician, complications of jaundice.

21
William Aston, 80, Australian politician.
Amasa Stone Bishop, American nuclear physicist, pneumonia.
Noël Browne, 81, Irish politician.
Fiorenzo Carpi, 78, Italian composer and pianist.

22
Myrtle Bachelder, 89, American chemist and Women's Army Corps officer.
Alziro Bergonzo, 90, Italian architect and painter.
Donald Curtis, 82, American actor.
Herman de Coninck, 53, Belgian poet, essayist, journalist and publisher, heart attack.
Genildo Ferreira de França, Brazilian spree killer, suicide.
Jimmy Heale, 82, English footballer.
Alfred Hershey, 88, American biochemist and recipient of the Nobel Prize in Physiology or Medicine, heart failure.
Raúl Gómez Jattin, 51, Colombian poet.
Arthur Milne, 82, Scottish football player.
Renzo Montagnani, 66, Italian actor, lung cancer.
Candis Pettway, 72, American artist.
Cornelius Michael Power, 84, American prelate of the Roman Catholic Church.
T. R. Ramanna, 74, Indian film director and producer.
Robert D. Russ, 64, United States Air Force general and commander of Tactical Air Command.
Stanisław Swianiewicz, 97, Polish economist and historian.
Klaus von Bismarck, 85, German broadcaster and cultural administrator.

23
Alison Adburgham, 85, English fashion journalist and author.
James Lee Byars, 65, American conceptual and performance artist, cancer.
Dorothy Gulliver, 88, American actress, pneumonia.
Sadayoshi Kobayashi, 92, Japanese field hockey player.
Lovie Lee, 88, American electric blues pianist and singer.
David M. Ludlum, 86, American historian, meteorologist, and author.
Albert Rosen, 73, Austrian-Irish conductor.

24
Muhammad Fadhel al-Jamali, 94, Iraqi politician and Prime Minister (1953-1954).
M. Aram, 70, Indian educator and peace advocate.
Kinpei Azusa, 66, Japanese voice actor, laryngeal cancer.
Robbie Branscum, 62, American children's author, heart attack.
Alfonso de Vinuesa, 38, Spanish racing driver, traffic collision.
Edward Mulhare, 74, Irish actor (Knight Rider, The Ghost and Mrs. Muir, Von Ryan's Express), lung cancer.
Sepp Weiler, 76, West German ski jumper and Olympian.

25
Syd Bidwell, 80, British politician.
Chester Feldman, 71, American producer of game shows.
Jay Hebert, 74, American golfer.
Joseph Hoffman, 88, American screenwriter.
Peter Rangmar, 40, Swedish comedian, actor and baritone.
Ronald Vernieux, 86, Indian sprinter and Olympian.

26
Jack Bennett, 76, Australian rules football player.
Jenny Rosenthal Bramley, 87, Russian-American physicist.
James Gordon, 88, American sprinter and Olympian.
Ralph Horween, 100, American football player and coach.
Bernard Jackson, 46, American football player and coach, liver cancer.
Jack Jersey, 55, Dutch singer, composer, and producer of light music, cancer.
Jack Vinall, 86, English football player and manager.
Manfred von Ardenne, 90, German physicist and inventor.

27
Robert Ambelain, 89, French essayist.
Henry Barakat, 83, Egyptian film director.
Karl Martz, 84, American studio potter and ceramic artist.
Azem Shkreli, 59, Albanian writer, poet, director and producer.

28
Ronald V. Book, 60, American theoretical computer scientist.
Sydney Guilaroff, 89, American Hollywood hairdresser, pneumonia.
Édouard Muller, 77, French road bicycle racer.
Sung Nak-woon, 71, South Korean football forward.
John H. Sengstacke, 84, American newspaper publisher, stroke.
John Stack, 73, American X-ray engineer, rower and Olympic champion.
Tatyana Sumarokova, 74, Soviet flight navigator during World War II.

29
Jeff Buckley, 30, American singer, songwriter and guitarist, accidental drowning.
George Fenneman, 77, American radio and television announcer, emphysema.
Alexander Kazhdan, 74, Soviet-American Byzantinist.
William H. McNichols, Jr., 87, American politician and mayor of Denver, Colorado (1968-1983).
Jack Parkinson, 73, American basketball player, brain tumor, brain cancer.

30
West Arkeen, 36, American musician and songwriter for Guns N' Roses, opiate overdose.
Béla Barényi, 90, Austro-Hungarian automotive engineer.
Winsome Cripps, 66, Australian sprinter.
Doris Lindsey Holland Rhodes, 87, American politician.

31
Pat Collins, 62, American hypnotist.
Frei Damião, 98, Italian Roman Catholic priest and missionary, stroke.
James Bennett Griffin, 92, American archaeologist.
Fazal Haq Mujahid, Afghanistan mujahideen during the Soviet–Afghan War, assassinated.
Eddie Jones, 68, American jazz double bassist.
Oswald Kaduk, 90, German SS officer and war criminal during World War II.
Jewel Lafontant, 75, American lawyer and White House official, breast cancer.
Ove Ljung, 79, Swedish Army officer.
Günter Luther, 75, German admiral.
Johnny Papalia, 73, Canadian mobster, shot.
Poul Petersen, 76, Danish football player and manager.

References 

1997-05
 05